Young County is one of the 141 Cadastral divisions of New South Wales. It includes the area to the west of Wilcannia. The Darling River is the south-eastern boundary.

Young County was named in honour of the twelfth Governor of New South Wales, Sir John Young, First Baron Lisgar (1807-1876).

Parishes within this county
A full list of parishes found within this county; their current LGA and mapping coordinates to the approximate centre of each location is as follows:

References

Counties of New South Wales